Mount Magalloway (or Magalloway Mountain) is a mountain in the Great North Woods region of New Hampshire in the United States. From the observation tower at its summit, three states and the Canadian province of Quebec are visible. The summit area includes a former watcher's cabin that is available for rent by the state.

References

Mountains of New Hampshire
Mountains of Coös County, New Hampshire
Pittsburg, New Hampshire
New Hampshire placenames of Native American origin